Eternal Spirit is an album by American jazz pianist Andrew Hill, recorded in 1989 and released on the Blue Note label. The album features six of Hill's original compositions performed by his quintet with alto saxophonist Greg Osby, vibraphonist Bobby Hutcherson, bassist Rufus Reid and drummer Ben Riley. Three alternate takes were added to the CD release as bonus tracks.

Reception 

The Allmusic review by Scott Yanow awarded the album 4½ stars and stated "There are no weak performances on this superb post bop effort, Andrew Hill's strongest recording in several years".

Track listing 
All compositions by Andrew Hill
 "Pinnacle" - 9:53
 "Golden Sunset" - 10:20
 "Samba Rasta" - 4:50
 "Tail Feather" - 6:16
 "Spiritual Lover" - 7:43
 "Bobby's Tune" - 8:41
 "Pinnacle" [alternate take] - 7:29 Bonus track on CD
 "Golden Sunset" [alternate take] - 5:12 Bonus track on CD
 "Spiritual Lover" [alternate take] - 6:44 Bonus track on CD
 Recorded at Rudy Van Gelder Studio, Englewood Cliffs, New Jersey on January 30 (tracks 4 & 6-9) and January 31 (tracks 1-3 & 5), 1989

Personnel 
 Andrew Hill - piano
 Greg Osby - alto saxophone
 Bobby Hutcherson - vibes
 Rufus Reid - bass
 Ben Riley - drums

References 

Blue Note Records albums
Andrew Hill albums
1989 albums
Albums recorded at Van Gelder Studio